Sarah Havlin is the first woman to be appointed to the role of Certification Officer of Northern Ireland, the regulator of trade unions and employer associations. She lives in Bangor, County Down. She is a solicitor by profession, and was appointed by the Northern Ireland Secretary of State as a Parades Commissioner for Northern Ireland in 2013. In 2015 she was appointed as Parliamentary Boundary Commissioner for Northern Ireland in accordance with Schedule 1 of the Parliamentary Constituencies Act 1986. In 2017, she was appointed as an independent standards investigator by the U.K press regulation authority, the Independent Press Standards Authority. http://www.pressgazette.co.uk/three-years-on-ipso-is-ready-to-carry-out-first-standards-investigation-after-appointing-nine-strong-panel/

In June 2020 Sarah Havlin was appointed as the Local Government Boundary Commissioner for Northern Ireland by the Minister for Communities of Northern Ireland.

References

 https://wih.web.ox.ac.uk/people/sarah-havlin

https://www.irishnews.com/news/northernirelandnews/2020/06/17/news/department-for-communities-announce-appointment-of-local-government-boundaries-commissioner-1976227/

External links
http://www.bbc.co.uk/news/uk-northern-ireland-25367197
http://m.belfasttelegraph.co.uk/news/northern-ireland/new-parades-commission-members-29836302.html
http://www.irishnews.com/news/2015/03/16/news/big-bucks-to-be-earned-by-taking-on-multiple-roles-118342/
https://www.gov.uk/government/news/new-parades-commission-appointed
https://www.nationaltrust.org.uk/mount-stewart/features/meet-our-guests
http://www.nicertoffice.org.uk/about-us/the-certification-officer/

Year of birth missing (living people)
Living people
People from Bangor, County Down
Irish women lawyers